Brigitte Kraus (born 12 August 1956 in Bensberg) is a retired West German middle-distance runner who specialized in the 1500 and 3000 metres.

She competed for the sports clubs LG Rhein-Berg and ASV Köln during her active career.

International competitions

1Did not finish in the final

References

Brigitte Kraus. Track and Field Statistics. Retrieved 2021-11-22.

1956 births
Living people
People from Bergisch Gladbach
Sportspeople from Cologne (region)
West German female middle-distance runners
Olympic athletes of West Germany
Athletes (track and field) at the 1976 Summer Olympics
Athletes (track and field) at the 1984 Summer Olympics
World Athletics Championships medalists
World Athletics Championships athletes for West Germany
ASV Köln athletes